This is a list of presidential trips made by Moncef Marzouki, the 3rd President of Tunisia. , Marzouki has made 38 international trips to 25 different countries since his presidency began with his 13 December 2011 inauguration until the transfer of power on 31 December 2014, in addition to many more trips made domestically within the Tunisia which are not shown on this list.

International trips

2012 
The following international trips were made by Moncef Marzouki during 2012:

2013 
The following international trips were made by Moncef Marzouki during 2013:

2014 

The following international trips were made by Moncef Marzouki during 2014:

References

Lists of diplomatic trips
Events in Tunisia
Tunisia diplomacy-related lists
Lists of 21st-century trips
Marzouki
Foreign relations of Tunisia
Presidents of Tunisia